A propósito de Sudán (English title: Journey of Hope) is a 2009 documentary film, directed by Lidia Peralta and Salah El Mur.

Synopsis 
By means of five 5-minute films, About Sudan submerges us in some of the most deeply rooted activities in daily life. Based primordially on sound and images, the spectators become acquainted with the Sudanese coffee ceremony, see what happens around a 70 m deep well, meet the river Nile, Sufism and travel in a peculiar public transport: the rickshaw. - Stroke brushes filled with curious facts about a surprising country.

See also 

 Cinema of Sudan

External links 

2009 films
Spanish short documentary films
Sudanese documentary films
2009 short documentary films
Documentary films about Sudan
2000s Spanish films
Films set in Sudan